The Ethiopian Biotechnology Institute (EBTi) is a  research institute owned by the Government of Ethiopia. It was established in 2016 in Addis Ababa, Ethiopia .

History 
The Ethiopian Biotechnology Institute was the first biotechnology policy to the Ministry of Science and Technology (MoST) for review and endorsement of its approval by the Council of Ministers (CoM).

References

External links 
Ethiopian Biotechnology Institute

Science and technology in Ethiopia
Government agencies of Ethiopia
Innovation ministries
Biotechnology